Dartmouth North is a provincial electoral district in Dartmouth, Nova Scotia, Canada, that elects one member of the Nova Scotia House of Assembly.

The district was created, under the name Dartmouth City North, in 1966 when Halifax County Dartmouth was divided into two electoral districts. In 1967, the district was renamed Dartmouth North. In 2003, the district gained the area on its southern boundary along Lake Banook from Dartmouth South.

Geography

Members of the Legislative Assembly
This riding has elected the following Members of the Legislative Assembly:

Election results

1967 general election

1970 general election

1974 general election

1978 general election

1981 general election

1984 general election

1988 general election

1993 general election

1998 general election

1999 general election

2003 general election

2006 general election

2009 general election

2013 general election 

 
|Liberal
|Joanne Bernard
|align="right"|2,953
|align="right"|44.06
|align="right"|
|-
 
|New Democratic Party
|Steve Estey
|align="right"|2,020
|align="right"|30.14
|align="right"|
|-
 
|Progressive Conservative
|Séan G. Brownlow
|align="right"|1,729
|align="right"|25.08
|align="right"|
|}

2017 general election

2021 general election

References

External links
2003 riding profile
 June 13, 2006 Nova Scotia Provincial General Election Poll By Poll Results

Nova Scotia provincial electoral districts
Dartmouth, Nova Scotia
Politics of Halifax, Nova Scotia